Pierre François Marie Le Jolis de Villiers de Saintignon (born 26 July 1956) dit Pierre de Villiers is an Army General of the French Army and a former Chief of the Defence Staff. Following a disagreement with President Emmanuel Macron, who is ex-officio Commander-in-chief of the Armed Forces, he tendered his resignation on 19 July 2017.

Biography

House Le Jolie de Villiers 

Pierre Le Jolis de Villiers de Saintignon is a member of the House of Le Jolis de Villiers established in the 16th century. His brother is the French politician Philippe de Villiers.

Early military career

20th century 
After two years of preparatory corniche at Prytanée National Militaire, Pierre Le Jolis de Villiers de Saintignon was admitted to the École spéciale militaire de Saint-Cyr in 1975, promotion « Captain Henri Guilleminot ». He entered at the end of his scholarity the Armoured Cavalry Arm and joined the Cavalry School of Saumur within his specialty, promotion « lieutenant Charles de Foucauld ». He was a section platoon chief of AMX30 tanks at the 2nd Dragoon Regiment in 1978.

He entered between 1979 and 1987 to the 4th Dragoon Regiment, which also housed a platoon of AMX30 tanks. He commanded a divisionary reconnaissance squadron of the 7th Armoured Division. He was then on three different occasions an instructor of sous-officiers and lieutenants at Saumur. From 1989 to 1990, he was a candidate at the Superior War School of the 103rd promotion of the ESG, then from 1990–1991, he was a candidate at the Superior Inter-arm Course (XLII session of the CSI).

He was then designated as the regimental commander of the 501st-503rd Combat Tank Regiment. In June 1999, he commanded during five months the mechanized infantry battalion of the Leclerc brigade, which entered first in Kosovo with operation KFOR. During twelve years, he was in post in Paris at the general staff headquarters of the French Army, then at the inspection of the French Army and member of the financial affairs direction of the Ministry of the Armed Forces.

21st century 
From September to June 2004, he was an auditor at the Center of High Military Studies and at the Institute of High National Defense Studies. Deputy to the Chief of the Prime Minister's military cabinet on 1 July 2004, he was promoted to Général de brigade on 1 September 2005. 

He was designated commandant of the 2nd Armoured Brigade and arms commandant of the court of Orléans on 1 August 2006, a function which he occupied until 31 August 2008. In parallel, from December 2006 to April 2007, he commanded the Regional Capital Command RCC in Afghanistan which regrouped 2500 military personnel from 15 nationalities.

He was nominated as at the Head of the Prime Minister's military cabinet on 15 September 2008, a function which occupied until March 2010, date in which he was replaced by Bernard de Courrèges d'Ustou. By decree on 11 March 2010, he was nominated to the functions of Major General of the Armed Forces at the general staff headquarters of the armed forces.

Chief of the Defence Staff 
Général de Villiers was appointed on 15 February 2014 Chief of the Defence Staff succeeding Admiral Édouard Guillaud. Charged with attacks against the Islamic State after the November 2015 Paris attacks, he judged that the necessary military attacks against this entity can only but guarantee peace and security, by recalling the comfort means of the French Armed Forces.

He coordinated the exterior operations of Operation Barkhane in Sahel, Operation Sangaris in Central African Republic and Opération Chammal in Syria and in Iraq. He was also equally in charge of the interior natured anti-terrorist operation, Opération Sentinelle.

The French Foreign Legion, on 30 April 2015, commemorated their 152nd anniversary of Camaron in presence of Villiers. Commemorating also the 70th Liberation Anniversary, Général de Villiers declared that " Commemorating Camerone is commemorating the courage, the cult of the mission, the respect of senior veterans, giving the youth a formidable message of hope for the future", while also adding that "« honor and fidelity are always values which gather »". 

During the ceremony, Adjudant-Chef François Monarcha, born in Poland 98 years and «4 months ago»- the senior veteran was insisting on this precision-, was part of the main parade as he was accompanied by a former Harki and a non-commissioned officer of British origin. Addressing the legionnaires, Général de Villiers declared "« Your regimental colors and flags do not have enough folds and space in them to house and contain all your titles of glory » ".

Position on defence budget 
In December 2016, Villiers called for an increase in armed forces' budget from 1.7% to 2% of gross domestic product (GDP) before 2022. This would allow France to meet the NATO defense spending requirements currently met by only the United States, Greece, United Kingdom, Estonia and Poland.

In March 2017, Villiers once again expressed support for increasing the defence budget to 2% of GDP by 2022 - an increase of about three billion euros per year. Emmanuel Macron announced a promise to increase the defence budget to 2% by 2025 and Marine Le Pen announced in Lyon that she wishes to see the defence budget increased to 3% of GDP in order to build a new aircraft carrier, hire 50,000 new military personnel and progressively reintroduce compulsory military service, starting with a 3-month commitment.

Criticism of Macron and resignation 
On 11 July 2017, Minister of Public Action and Accounts Gérald Darmanin announced that part of the government's plan to reduce spending, the military were going to be cut by 850 million euros in 2017. The following day, Le Monde reported that Villiers met with the Defense Committee in the National Assembly and told them "I will not get fucked over like this". The conversation was caught on tape and leaked by Le Monde. Also, accordingly to Le Figaro, Villiers unleashed his fury, and added monumentally "I can no longer look my guys in the eyes if we reduce our means further".

Emmanuel Macron, during a speech to the armed forces on 13 July 2017 in which he famously said "I am the boss", affirmed his plan to raise the defence budget to 2% of GDP by 2025. During the speech, Macron publicly called out de Villiers numerous times, addressing the recent leak reported by Le Monde. During Bastille Day military parade, Général de Villiers and President Macron, as customary for the Chief and Commander-in-Chief of the French Armed Forces, rode together standing side by side in the same vehicle during the ceremonial parade.

Following the Bastille Day parade, Villiers posted on Facebook a criticism of the Macron government's plans to reduce defence spending. Le Journal du Dimanche reported on 16 July 2017 that Macron was possibly looking to replace de Villiers stating "The Republic doesn't work like this" Macron then went on to say that he has confidence in de Villiers. 

Général de Villiers stepped down on 19 July 2017 due to budget cuts and disagreements with President Emmanuel Macron. This was the first time in the 5th Republic that a Chief of the Defence Staff has forcibly resigned. A press release was issued on francetvinfo's website. On the same day, Macron confirmed Army general François Lecointre as Villiers' replacement. Macron described Villiers' behaviour surrounding his resignation as "undignified".

While de Villiers was leaving the Ministry of Armed Forces, a crowd of soldiers and military personnel applauded him.

In retirement
Following his resignation, speculation arose that he might enter politics: Polling in 2020 found that 20% of French voters might've supported him in the 2022 presidential election.

Military ranks

Honours and decorations

Pierre de Villiers is an Honorary Caporal (bestowed) of the Troupes de marine (2014).

Publications 
 Servir (Paris : ed. Fayard, 2017)
 Qu'est-ce-qu'un chef ? (Paris : ed. Fayard, 2018)
 L'équilibre est un courage (Paris : ed. Fayard, 2020)
 Paroles d'honneur (Paris : ed. Fayard, 2022)

See also 
 Édouard Guillaud
 Bruno Dary
 Benoit Puga
 Jean Maurin
 Hervé Charpentier
 François Lecointre

References

Sources 

French generals
French military staff
1956 births
Living people
Grand Officiers of the Légion d'honneur
Officers of the Ordre national du Mérite
Recipients of the Cross for Military Valour
Commanders of the Legion of Merit
Commanders Crosses of the Order of Merit of the Federal Republic of Germany
Recipients of the Order of Valour
Recipients of the Order pro Merito Melitensi
Chief of the Defence Staff (France)
Recipients of orders, decorations, and medals of Senegal